All Wrong is an American comedy silent film released 1 June 1919. The film was directed by Raymond B. West and William Worthington, to a script by Mildred Considine and Jack Cunningham. The film starred Bryant Washburn, but was the breakthrough role for Mildred Davis.

Cast
Bryant Washburn as Warren Kent
Mildred Davis as Betty Thompson
Charles Bennett as Donald Thompson
Helen Dunbar as Mrs. Donald Thompson
Fred Montague as Randolph Graham
Margaret Livingston as Ethel Goodwin

References

External links

1919 films
American silent feature films
Silent American comedy films
American black-and-white films
1919 comedy films
Pathé Exchange films
Films directed by Raymond B. West
1910s American films